Fabry or Fábry is a surname. Notable people with the surname include:

Branislav Fábry (born 1985), Slovak ice hockey player
Charles Fabry, French physicist, co-inventor of the Fabry-Pérot etalon
Jean Fabry (1876-1968), French politician
Johannes Fabry, German dermatologist who provided the first description of Fabry disease
Joseph Fabry, author and editor of logotherapy
Pál Fábry, Hungarian politician and journalist
Sándor Fábry, Hungarian showman

Fictional characters:
Fabry, Chief Engineer at Rossum's Universal Robots in the play R.U.R.

See also 
Fabry disease - a genetic disorder that can affect the kidneys, heart, and skin caused by a deficiency in the enzyme alpha-galactosidase A
 Fabbri
 Fabre
 Fabri